Titie Said was the pen name of Sitti Raya Kusumowardani (1935–2011), an Indonesian writer and journalist. She was especially known for her short stories and her many novels.

Biography
She was born Sitti Raya in Bojonegoro, East Java, Dutch East Indies on 11 July 1935. Her mother was named Hastuti Suwanti and her father was called Muhammad Said; he had been a schoolteacher, soldier, and writer during the Dutch era. She was first educated in an elementary school in Bojonegoro starting in 1948. She then relocated to Malang to complete her secondary education. After 1959 she relocated to Jakarta to study in the Literature department at the University of Indonesia; however, she did not finish her degree.

In 1958, she became a journalist for a women's magazine. In the same year she married H. Sadikun Sugihwaras. She was editor of the magazine  and chief editor of the magazine . She served as chair of the Indonesian Film Censorship Board from 2003 to 2006 and from 2006 to 2009.

A number of her books have been made into films.

She died after having a stroke at the Medistra Hospital in Jakarta.

References 

1935 births
2011 deaths
Indonesian women novelists
Indonesian novelists
Indonesian women short story writers
Indonesian short story writers
Indonesian journalists
Indonesian women journalists
20th-century novelists
People from Bojonegoro Regency
20th-century short story writers
20th-century women writers
20th-century Indonesian women writers
20th-century Indonesian writers